Magangué is a municipality of Colombia in the Department of Bolivar. The town is located in the Magdalena River; 20 km north of the mouth of the Cauca River, the Magdalena River. According to projections, the city has a population of over 198,000 inhabitants, becoming the twenty-seventh largest city in Colombia, with about 800,000 inhabitants in the Association Sabana Metropolitan, making it the eighth largest metropolitan area in Colombia. It is the second largest city of the Department, and the ninth largest of the Caribbean Region. Magangué was home to the country's largest port, now badly damaged by the problems of political corruption. It has been shown that the city has great national potential, due to its strategic location.

History 
Studies and research are still in their infancy, there are only approaches and assumptions based on interpretations of the records left by some writers and settlers who came from Spain. Most of them assert that original population were indigenous belonging to the family Chimilas Carib language that inhabited the extensive river and lake region of Bolivar, Sucre, Magdalena and Cesar departments. The highest regional authority was the Chimilas Mompox and her chiefdoms: Maguey, Yati, or Simacoa Tacaloa, etc. Guazo. Indigenous had an average height of 1.65 meters, were more or less heavyset, had black hair, short legs, dark skin and short prominent nose. Despite speaking a language related to that of the Carib people, who were warlike and resisted the Spaniards, the Maguey were peaceful and docile. They mainly engaged in the farming of cassava and corn and were also experts in fishing and hunting. Both men and women engaged in these tasks.

Administrative divisions 

The urban area is divided into an average of 50 to 70 neighborhoods, including:

 Florida
 Camilo Torres
 Olaya Herrera
 El Sur
 San Pablo
 San José
 El Prado
 San Mateo
 Pastrana
 El Recreo

The rural area is organized in 43 districts.

The major townships are:

 Ceibal
 Juan Árias
 San Sebastián de Madrid
 La Pascuala
 Yatí
 Cascajal
 Henequén
 El Cuatro
 Betania
 Retiro
 Barbosa
 Coyongal
 San Antonio

References

Populated places in the Bolívar Department